Ole Martin Rindarøy (born 16 May 1995) is a Norwegian retired football defender.

Career

Club
Rindarøy hails from Aukra where he started his youth career in Gossen. When his older brother Knut Olav Rindarøy was signed by Molde FK, the family moved to Molde. Ole Martin Rindarøy joined the same club and made his first-team debut in the 2011 Norwegian Football Cup against Tiller IL.

On 8 February 2016, Rindarøy was loaned to Lillestrøm for the 2016 season. He returned to Molde on 31 December 2016.

After playing for Sogndal on loan from August to December 2017, Rindarøy signed a permanent contract with the club on 31 January 2018.

In February 2020, at 24-years-old, Rindarøy was forced to retire due to injuries.

Career statistics

Club

References

1995 births
Living people
People from Aukra
Norwegian footballers
Norway youth international footballers
Molde FK players
IK Start players
Lillestrøm SK players
Sogndal Fotball players
Eliteserien players
Association football defenders
Sportspeople from Møre og Romsdal